Zaida is a town and Union Council in Swabi District of Khyber-Pakhtunkhwa, Pakistan. It is located at 34°4'0N 72°28'0E with an altitude of 306 metres (1007 feet).
 
 

 
HISTORY
 
 
 
Zaida is one of the oldest trading centres of the area and its bazaar is one of the oldest in the district. The history of Zaida and its khans dates back to the pre Islamic era.
 
 
 
 
 
 
 
The Genealogy of the Khans of Zaida is:
 
 
 
 
 
 
 
Dargahi Khan
 
 
 
Sikandar Khan
 
 
 
Himat Khan
 
 
 
Hashim Khan
 
 
 
Ibrahim Khan
 
 
 
Shah Wali Khan
 
 
 
Muhammad Azam Khan Azam
 
 
 
Rana Khan
 
 
 
Zabita Khan
 
 
 
Letaf Khan
 
 
 
Muhammad Ashraf Khan
 
 
 
Khan Sakhi Arsalah Khan
 
 
 
Bahram Khan
 
 
 
Nawab Muhammad Ibrahim Khan
 
 
 
Khan Bahadur Abdul Ghafoor Khan
 
 
 
Khan Saheb Abdul Hameed Khan
 
 
 
Khan Abdus Sallam Khan
 

 
 
 
 
 
 
The name of the progenitor of the Khans of Zaida was Ballar Khan. Daraghi is said to be his progeny in the eighteenth generation.

References
 

 
 
 
Pakistan Air Force training aircraft crashed in Swabi district of Khyber Pakhtunkhwa province.
 
On Monday 25, 2015[clarification needed] at 10:17 AM, a training aircraft of the Pakistan Air Force crashed in Swabi district of Khyber Pakhtunkhwa province; both pilots of the aircraft ejected safely but sustained injuries. PAF spokesperson Air Commodore SM ALi said that a K-8 trainer aircraft was destroyed when it crashed during a training mission in Zaida village of KP's Swabi district. No loss of civilian life or property was reported on the ground as plan landed in open fields. Pictures

References 

Populated places in Swabi District